Fort Fleur d'épée is a fortification on Grande-Terre on Guadeloupe. The origins of its name are unknown, though it may correspond to a nickname of a soldier who lived in it. It was built from 1750 to 1763 to a polygonal plan by Vauban in the heights above the town of Gosier, many metres above the bay. It is made up of underground rooms leading to small rooms. The powder magazine and kitchen with a furnace are still visible. Its spacious entrance hall now hosts temporary art exhibitions. It was captured by the British then retaken by a French battalion under Victor Hugues which expelled the British from Guadeloupe on 3 June 1794.

18th century in Guadeloupe
Forts in France